In Greek mythology, a centaur is creature that is half human, half horse.

Centaur may also refer to:

Computing 
 Centaur (computing), an external memory controller for the POWER8 processors
 Centaur Technology, a CPU design company

Film and TV 
 The Centaurs (1921 film), an animation by Winsor McCay
 Centaur (2016 film), a 2016 Kyrgyzstani film
 USS Centaur, a fictional spaceship from the Star Trek: Deep Space Nine episode "A Time to Stand"

Literature 
 Narnian Centaurs, the representation of centaurs in C. S. Lewis's Chronicles of Narnia
 The Centaur, a 1963 novel by John Updike
 Centaur Publications (1938–1942), one of the earliest American comic book publishers

Military 
 Centaur tank, a British World War II tank
 AHS Centaur, an Australian hospital ship sunk by the Japanese during World War II
 HMS Centaur, the name of five different Royal Navy warships

Music 
 Centaur, an American rock band formed in 2000 by Hum founder Matt Talbott.
 "The Centaur," a song by Buck 65 from the album Vertex
 Centaur Records, a classical music record label in America

Space 
 Centaurus, a constellation
 Centaur (small Solar System body), a class of small Solar System bodies orbiting between Jupiter and Neptune
 Centaur (rocket stage), an American rocket stage used for space launches

Transportation 
 Acme Centaur, a conversion program for the Stinson L-13 aircraft
 Centaur (1849 ship), a brig shipwrecked off Western Australia
 Rambler Centaur, a 1962 show car by American Motors
 SB Centaur, an 1895 Thames sailing barge

Other uses 
 Centaur (typeface), a 20th-century serif typeface based on Renaissance models
 Centaur (pinball), a pinball machine
 Centaur (chess), a fairy chess piece that can move like a mann or a knight
 Centaur, a freestyle chess player in advanced chess
 Centaur Media, a UK marketing company

See also 
 Centaure (disambiguation)
 Centauri (disambiguation)
 Centaurus (disambiguation)